Zalesie  is a settlement in the administrative district of Gmina Świątniki Górne, within Kraków County, Lesser Poland Voivodeship, in southern Poland.

References

Villages in Kraków County